Frank Ellis Smith (February 21, 1918 – August 2, 1997) was a U.S. Representative from Mississippi.

Born in Sidon, Mississippi, Smith attended the public schools of Sidon and Greenwood, Mississippi. He graduated from Sunflower Junior College, Moorhead, Mississippi, in 1936, and from the University of Mississippi in 1941, where he was a member of Beta Theta Pi. He entered the United States Army as a private on February 9, 1942.

He was a graduate of Field Artillery Officers Candidate School and served in Europe as a captain with the Two Hundred and Forty-third Field Artillery Battalion, Third Army. He was discharged to the Reserves as a major of Field Artillery on February 13, 1946.

He was managing editor of the Greenwood Morning Call in 1946 and 1947, and a student at American University, Washington, D.C., in 1946. He was a legislative assistant to United States Senator John Stennis from 1947 to 1949, and served as a member of the state senate from 1948 to 1950.

Smith was elected as a Democrat to the Eighty-second and to the five succeeding Congresses, and served from January 3, 1951, until his resignation November 14, 1962.
He was unsuccessful for renomination in 1962 to the Eighty-eighth Congress.

Smith worked passionately for racial reconciliation. In his book "Congressman From Mississippi" (1964) he detailed his non-race-based politics. Despite this, he was a signatory to the 1956 Southern Manifesto that opposed the desegregation of public schools ordered by the Supreme Court in Brown v. Board of Education.

Smith served as member of the Board of Directors of the Tennessee Valley Authority from November 14, 1962, to May 18, 1972. He ran third in a 1972 congressional primary in seeking reelection to the U.S. House and missed the runoff. He served as associate director of the Illinois State Board of Higher Education from 1973 to 1974; was a visiting professor at Virginia Polytechnic Institute from 1977 to 1979; and special assistant to Governor William Winter of Mississippi from 1980 to 1983. Smith was elected life fellow of the Southern Regional Council in 1984.

He died in Jackson, Mississippi, on August 2, 1997.

References

Further reading

1918 births
1997 deaths
United States Army personnel of World War II
United States Army officers
University of Mississippi alumni
Editors of Mississippi newspapers
Democratic Party Mississippi state senators
Democratic Party members of the United States House of Representatives from Mississippi
United States congressional aides
20th-century American politicians
People from Sidon, Mississippi
United States Army reservists